Aquia may refer to:

 Aquia (video game)
 Aquia, Virginia
 Aquia District, Peru
 Aquia Creek
 Battle of Aquia Creek
 Aquia Creek sandstone
 Aquia Formation, a fossil site
 Aquia Church, historic Episcopal Church (USA) Episcopal church and parish

See also
 Acquia